is an outdoor aviation museum located in Bihoro in Hokkaido Prefecture in Japan.

Aircraft displayed
 JG-0505 Beechcraft T-34 Mentor (Japan Ground Self-Defense Force)
 52-0076 North American T-6 Texan (Japan Air Self-Defense Force)
 81-5386 Lockheed T-33A Shooting Star (Japan Air Self-Defense Force)
 41583 HU-1B Iroquois (Japan Ground Self-Defense Force)
 JG-0001 Piasecki H-21 (Japan Ground Self-Defense Force)

Gallery

References

External links
 Video tour

Aerospace museums in Japan
History museums in Japan
Museums in Hokkaido